Dakṣiṇāmnāya Śrī Śāradā Pīṭham or Śri Śṛṅgagiri Maṭha is one amongst the five cardinal pīthams following the Daśanāmi Sampradaya - the peetham or matha is said to have been established by acharya Śrī Ādi Śaṅkara to preserve and propagate Sanātana Dharma and Advaita Vedānta, the doctrine of non-dualism. Located in Śringerī in Chikmagalur district in Karnataka, India, it is the Southern Āmnāya Pītham amongst the four Chaturāmnāya Pīthams, with the others being the Dvārakā Śāradā Pītham (Gujarat) in the West, Purī Govardhana Pīṭhaṃ (Odisha) in the East, Badri Jyotishpīṭhaṃ (Uttarakhand) in the North  and the Sarvagnya Pītham being Kanchi Kamakoti Sarvagnya Peetam again in the South (Tamil Nadu). The head of the matha is called Shankarayacharya, the title derives from Adi Shankara.

Śri Śringerī Mutt, as the Pītham is referred to in common parlance, is situated on the banks of the Tuṅgā River in Śringerī. The Mutt complex consists of shrines on both the northern and southern banks of the river. The three prominent shrines on the northern bank of the Tunga are dedicated to the presiding deity of the Pītham and the divinity of Ātma-vidyā - Śrī Śāradā, Śrī Ādi Śaṅkara, and Jagadguru Śrī Vidyāśankara Tīrtha, the 10th Jagadguru of the Pītham. The southern bank houses the residence of the reigning pontiff, the adhisthānam shrines of the previous pontiffs and the Sadvidyā Sañjīvini Samskrita Mahāpāthashālā.

The Pītham is traditionally headed by an ascetic pontiff belonging to the order of  the Jagadguru Śankarāchārya. According to tradition, the first pontiff of the Pītham was Śrī Ādi Śaṅkara's eldest disciple, Śrī Sureshvarāchārya, renowned for his treatises on Vedānta - Mānasollāsa and Naishkarmya-Siddhi. The current pontiff, Śrī Bhārathī Tīrtha Svāmin is the 36th Jagadguru in the  since-unbroken spiritual succession of pontiffs.

The Pītham is one of the major Hindu institutions that has historically coordinated Smārta tradition and monastic activities through satellite institutions in South India, preserved Sanskrit literature and pursued Advaita studies. The Pītham runs several vedic schools (pathashalas), maintains libraries and repositories of historic Sanskrit manuscripts. The Śringerī Mutt has been active in preserving Vedas, sponsoring students and recitals, Sanskrit scholarship, and celebrating traditional annual festivals such as Śaṅkara Jayanti and Guru Pūrnima (Vyāsa Pūrnima). The Pītham has branches across India and maintains temples at several locations. It also has a social outreach programme. It has initiated various reforms against orthodoxy in an initiative to become the holy see of a single united Hindu religion with the support of the BJP and the Sangh Parivar.

Location
Sringeri can be accessed from Bangalore and Mangalore via road.

History

Establishment

Traditional accounts
According to tradition, Sri Adi Shankaracharya, the principal exponent of Advaita Vedanta, established four pithams (dioceses) in India to preserve and propagate Sanatana Dharma and Advaita Vedanta. These were Sringeri Sri Sharada Peetham (Karnataka) in the South, Dvārakā Śāradā Pītham (Gujarat) in the West, Purī Govardhan Pīṭhaṃ (Odisha) in the East and Badri Jyotishpīṭhaṃ (Uttarakhand) in the North.

A hagiographic legend states that Sri Adi Shankara, during His travels across India, witnessed a snake unveiling its hood like an umbrella to shield a pregnant frog from the hot sun on the banks of the river Tunga in Sringeri. Deducing that non-violence amongst natural predators was innate to a holy spot, Sri Adi Shankara decided to establish His first Peetham in Sringeri. Sringeri is independently associated with Sage Rishyasringa of Ramayana fame, son of Sage Vibhandaka.

According to tradition, Shankara also instituted the tradition of appointing a succession of monastic pontifical heads, called the Jagadgurus, to each of the four monasteries, installing Sri Sureshvaracharya, Sri Hastamalakacharya, Sri Padmapadacharya and Sri Totakacharya as the first Jagadgurus of the Peethams at Sringeri, Dvaraka, Puri and Badri respectively. According to tradition, Sri Adi Shankara installed Sri Sureshwaracharya, believed by tradition to be the same as Maṇḍana Miśra, as the first acharya of the Peetham at Sringeri before resuming his tour to establish the three remaining Peethams at Puri, Dwaraka and Badarinath. The math holds one of the four Mahavaakyas, Aham-Bramhasmi. The math claims to have a lineage of Jagadgurus, stretching back straight to Sri Adi Shankaracharya himself. The present and 36th Jagadguru acharya of this peetham is Jagadguru Bharathi Teertha Mahaswami. His guru was Jagadguru Sri Abhinava Vidyatirtha Mahaswami. The successor-designate (the 37th Jagadguru acharya) was appointed in 2015, and was given the Yogapatta (monastic name) Sri Vidhushekhara Bharati Mahaswami.

Historical accounts 
While tradition attributes the establishment of Sringeri Sharada Peetham to Adi Shankara (8th century), the history of Sringeri Peetham from the time of Adi Shankara to about the 14th century is unknown. This may be because the sources are contradictory about the dates and events, in part because of the loss of records, and also because the pontiffs of the monastery adopted the same name which has created confusion in understanding the surviving records. Yet, it may also be because the peetham was not founded by Shankara, but only centuries later. The early inscriptions that mention Sringeri, all in Nagari script and the regional Kannada language, are donative or commemorative. Though useful in establishing the significance of the matha, they lack details to help establish the early history. According to Hermann Kulke, the early history of Sringeri is unknown and the earliest epigraphical evidence in the region is from the 12th century and belongs to the Jainism tradition. According to Paul Hacker, no mention of the mathas can be found before the 14th century CE. Until the 15th century, the timespan of the directors of Sringeri Math are unrealistically long, spanning 60+ and even 105 years. After 1386, the timespans become much shorter. According to Hacker, these mathas were probably established in the 14th century, to propagate Shankara's view of Advaita.

Vijayanagara Empire - Vidyaranya
The history of Sringeri Peetha is recorded in the matha's literature as well as in kadatas (ledger records and inscriptions of various forms) and sanads (charters) from the 14th century onwards.

A pivotal figure in the history of the matha is Vidyaranya (sometimes referred to as Madhava Vidyaranya or Madhavacharya) who was an ideological support and the intellectual inspiration for the founders of the Vijayanagara Empire. He helped Harihara I and his brother Bukka to build a Hindu army to overthrow the Muslim rule in the Deccan region, and re-establish a powerful Hindu kingdom from Hampi. In his counsel, the Vijayanagara founders lead an expansive conquest of much of the southern Indian peninsula, taking over lands from the Sultanates that had formed after several invasions by the Delhi Sultanate. According to tradition, the monk's efforts were supported by the 10th and 11th pontiff of Sringeri peetham. Vidyaranya later became the 12th acharya of the Sringeri peetham in 1375 CE. Shortly after the start of the Vijayanagara empire in 1336 CE, the rulers began building the Vidyashankara temple at the Sringeri peetham site. This temple was completed in 1338. The Vijayanagara rulers repaired and built numerous more Hindu and Jain temples in and around the Sringeri matha and elsewhere in their empire. This is a period where numerous inscriptions help establish the existence of the Sringeri peetham from the 14th century onwards.

The Vijayanagara rulers Harihara and Bukka gave a sarvamanya (tax-exempt) gift of land in and around Sringeri in 1346 CE to the Sringeri matha guru Bharati Tirtha, in a manner common in the Indian tradition for centuries, to help defray the costs of operating the monastery and temples. The grant is evidenced by a stone inscription by the king who reverentially refers to the 10th pontiff of Sringeri matha as a guru (counsellor, teacher). This grant became a six-century tradition that ended in the 1960s and 1970s when the Indian central government introduced and enforced a land-reform law that redistributed the land. The Vijayanagara empire gift also began a regional philanthropic tradition of endowments by the wealthy and the elderly population to the Sringeri matha. The matha managed the land and therefore operated as a sociopolitical network and land-grant institution for over 600 years beyond its religious role and spiritual scholarship. This relationship between the monastery and the regional population has been guided by a mutual upcara (hospitality, appropriate conduct) guideline between the matha and the populace. According to Leela Prasad, this upcara has been guided by the Hindu Dharmasutras and Dharmasastras texts preserved and interpreted by the matha, one composed by a range of authors and generally dated to be from the second half of the 1st-millennium BCE through about 400 CE.

In the late 15th century, the patronage of the Vijayanagara kings shifted to Vaisnavism. Following this loss of patronage, Sringeri matha had to find other means to propagate its former status, and the story of Shankara establishing the four cardinal mathas may have originated in the 16th century.

According to Shastri, following the traditional accounts, the Vijayanagara kings visited the Sringeri monastery many times over some 200 years and left inscriptions praising the monks, revering their knowledge of the Vedas and their scholarship. The monastery also provided the Vijayanagara empire administration with guidance on governance. The descendant rulers of the Vijayanagara empire regularly visited the monastery and made a series of endowments to the Sringeri matha as evidenced by various inscriptions. They also established the agrahara of Vidyaranyapuram with a land grant for the Brahmins, and in the 15th century established the earliest version of the Saradamba temple found at the Sringeri peetham site. The tradition of establishing satellite institutions under the supervision of the Sringeri peetham started in the Vijayanagara empire period. For example, Vidyaranya organized a matha in Hampi.

Keladi era
After the defeat of the Vijayanagara empire and the destruction of Hampi  by a coalition of Deccan sultanates, the Vijayanagara empire territories faced a political turmoil. The Deccan region was largely divided among five Islamic sultanates. The coastal regions of Karnataka that included the Sringiri matha ultimately came under the control of the Nayakas of Keladi from the Lingayatism tradition, who has previously served as governors for the Vijayanagara emperors. The Keladi dynasty supported the Sringiri peetham for nearly 250 years, from 1499 to 1763, when the Keladi Nayakas rule was ended by Hyder Ali seeking to create a sultanate from Mysore.

The Sringeri matha received gifts and grants from the Keladi Nayakas, as evidenced by ledger records and literature preserved by the monastery. Unlike the copious epigraphical evidence from the Vijayanagara era, few inscriptions from the Keladi era history are available and the history of this period is mostly discernible from the literary records. The lands held by the monastery and the goods meant for its operation were treated by the Nayakas as tax-exempt and not subject to any tariffs. Additionally, the 17th-century records show that the matha received special gifts from the Lingayat rulers on festive occasions such as acharavicharas and Diwali. Some of the Nayaka princes studied at a school run by the monastery.

Maratha era
The Sringeri matha was supported by the Maratha rulers when they came to power in the post-Aurangzeb Mughal era. The monastery provided the Marathas with counsel in return as evidenced by over two dozen letters, mostly in the Marathi language and some in Sanskrit using Kannada script. These have been preserved by the monastery. According to the letters and ledger entries, the Maratha rulers delivered gifts and bestowed grants to the monastery between 1738 and 1894. The letters of the Maratha rulers are typically in Marathi, while the replies from the Sringeri pontiff are in Sanskrit. In addition to these records, the monastery literature mention land grants from the Marathas as well as records of the visit by the jagadguru (pontiff) to Maratha ruled regions and towns such as Pune and Nasik.

The religio-political significance of the Sringeri monastery was such that both the Marathas and the Muslim ruler Hyder Ali sought "cordial relations" with it. According to Leela Prasad, after the Maratha ruler Raghunatha Rao invited the Sringeri matha's Jagadguru to visit him and the pontiff accepted the invitation, when Hyder Ali – whose hostility to the Marathas had been legendary – heard about the trip, Hyder Ali sent the Jagadguru gifts and an escort consisting of a palanquin, five horses, an elephant and cash for the travel expenses.

Maratha sacking of the temple in 1791
After the third Anglo-Mysore war in 1791 between the armies of the British and Maratha coalition and those of Tipu Sultan, a part of the defeated contingent of the Marathas, that is, the irregular 
Pindaris returned through Sringeri and looted the monastery temples of its gold and copper, statues, killed some Brahmin priests, and destroyed property. The news reached Tipu Sultan, who sent funds to restore the damage. Tipu Sultan, a Muslim, also sent a letter requesting the Jagadguru to perform penance and Hindu worship for "good showers and crops". Scholars have interpreted this event both as an evidence of Tipu Sultan's religious tolerance and the predatory habits of some contingents in the Maratha army, or alternatively as a strategic political move by Tipu Sultan to request the monastery to perform "superstitious rites" to "conciliate with his Hindu subjects and to discomfort his Maratha enemies", quotes Leela Prasad.

The sacking led to a protest by the pontiff of the Sringeri matha who started a fast to death on the banks of the Tunga river. According to Shastri, after the Maratha Peshwa ruler learned about the Pindari sacking, he took corrective action and sent his contingents to locate the loot, the statues, gold and copper, to return it along with compensation. In the years and decades that followed the Pindari sacking of 1791, the cordial relations and mutual support between the Sringeri monastery and the Maratha rulers returned. However, according to Leela Prasad, the culprits were never brought to book and neither was any compensation given to the temple.

British rule
The Sringeri monastery has been a historic politico-religious center at least from the 14th century. Along with the Vijayanagara emperors and the Mysore Muslim rulers such as Hyder Ali and Tipu Sultan, the colonial British authorities and their Nayak and Wodeyar dynasty appointees considered the monastery to be a strategically important hub for regional politics. Its operations were a target of surveillance, its collection of Hindu texts on Dharma and its counsel given its regional significance were sought by the British authorities.

Reforms for a single united Indian religion
The Matha is engaged in campaigns to broaden its reach by seeking converts from rival Hindu sects like Srautas, Saiva Siddhanta Adi Saivas, Veera Saiva Aradhyas, Sri Vaishnavas and the Madhva Sampradaya to name a few, thereby becoming a unifier of Hinduism in the south. These efforts for a single united Indian religion have been supported by Hindu organisations and political parties like the Swadeshi Jagran Manch, an RSS affiliate and the Tamil Nadu unit of the BJP.

Recently, the math pandits have added Buddha as the ninth Avatara of Vishnu dropping the original eighth avatara Balarama as quoted by Adi Shankara in works like Prapanchasara. This change in the Sharannavaratrotsava recital is aimed at ending foundational animosities with the arch rival of Astika Vedantism, the Nastika Buddhism. This is seen as a softening of stance, as the Matha's founder Sureśvara, prior his sanyasa initiation was a disciple of the Purva Mimamsa school of Kumarila Bhatta. The primary motive of this school was to decimate Nastika philosophies, primarily Buddhism and secondarily Jainism.

Also, Go Vegan, a program to promote Vegan culture is telecasted in Sri Sankara TV ending with the blessing cards of the Jagadgurus endorsing the campaign against all the cruel animal products including milk, silk and honey which are used for attire and Abhishekam in the Math. This initiative, dropping the Vyasa's Vedantic Brahma Sutra 3.1.25 is aimed at bringing a foundational compromise for achieving doctrinal unity with Jainism and Buddhism. Further, in a ritualistic compromise with the Nastikas, the Math has also stopped Agamic animal sacrifices in temples in the Ramnad Samsthanam and the Gobichettipalayam Mariamman temple to name a few. This change from orthodoxy has been welcomed by many like the PETA and Hindu organisations, though the cardinal Math of the east, Puri Govardhana Matha sticks to the orthodoxy, allowing animal sacrifices in the Vimala Shakti Peetham inside the Puri Jagannath temple.

Starting in 2011, the Math has started admitting Dalit students from the formerly lowest Paraya caste for Vedic studies to promote caste eradication in the new world order. Also reportedly, the Shankaracharya has called for the deletion of certain passages from Hindu literature seen as slurs.

The birth place, year and the spot of final Samadhi of Adi Shankaracharya have been identified through dreams of the seers of the math and thereby recognised by the Government of India, though these have not been approved by the other three cardinal Shankaracharya Maths.

Monastery buildings

Temples

The Sringeri matha includes two major temples. One is dedicated to Shiva and is called the Vidya Shankara temple, the other to Saraswati and is called the Sharada Amba temple. The earliest version of the Shiva temple was built in the 14th century, of goddess Saraswati in the 15th century.

The Vidyashankara temple is a fusion of pre-Vijayanagara Hindu temple architecture traditions with Hoysalas and Vijayanagara styles, giving it an unusual appearance. The temple has an apsidal shape with its interior chambers and sanctum set on the square principle while the spire and outer walls use an almost circular plan. The temple is set on a high plinth like the Hoysala temples, with the basement adorned with sculpted animals and balustrades with yalis flanking the steps. The outer walls of the Shiva temple have large sculptured panels at right angles to each other and these show the major gods and goddess of Vedic tradition and post-Vedic Shaivism, Vaishnavism, Shaktism, Saurism (Surya) and Ganapatya (Ganesha) traditions of Hinduism. The base of the temple have relief friezes depicting a large variety of stories from Hindu epics and puranas. The sanctum has a linga, the southern side of the sanctum features Brahma-Sarawati, the western side Vishnu-Lakshmi, and the northern side Shiva-Parvati.

The temple can be entered from four directions. Inside the temple is a large mandapa with intricately carved pillars, several antechambers with artwork, a sanctum with linga and a circumambulation passageway around it. The passageway opens to smaller shrines dedicated to Hindu gods and goddesses from various Hindu traditions. According to George Michell, the current Vidyashankara temple reflects the 16th-century additions.

Saraswati, the goddess of knowledge and arts in the Hindu tradition, is the presiding deity of the monastery. The monastery tradition states that Adi Shankara installed a sandalwood image of Saraswati as Saradamba in a simple shrine, one that was replaced with its current copy in gold during the Vijayanagara era. The shrine was rebuilt in the 15th century and expanded in the early 20th century. The temple has a maha-mandapa (main hall) with images of saptamatrikas (seven mothers) sculpted. The goddess sits in a golden chariot. Along with Saraswati in the sanctum, the temple has small shrines for Ganesha and for Bhuvaneshvari. The Saradambda temple and nearby structures additionally house a library, a Vedic school, a shrine for Adi Shankara, and other facilities of the monastery. It has been the historic epicenter of Sringeri's annual Navaratri festival celebrations, as well as the chariot festival held in February or March every year. The temple also gives the site its name, with "Sarada peetha" meaning "seat of learning". The temple was renovated to its current form in 1916.

Library
Sringeri matha has preserved and been a source of ancient Sanskrit manuscripts to scholars. In the contemporary monastery, a library is located on the first floor of the Saradamba temple. It has about 500 palm-leaf manuscripts and a large collection of paper manuscripts, most of which are in Sanskrit. These manuscripts are not only related to Advaita philosophy, but to classical subjects such as Sanskrit grammar, Dharmasutras, ethics, and arts.

Organization
The Sringeri Sharada Peetham, over its centuries of operations has evolved a structure to manage the monastery, its succession and its branches. Some of the key positions and features include:
Jagadguru (lit. "teacher of mankind") is the pontiff, both in spiritual and secular sense. A celibate ascetic by tradition, he leads the learning institutions within the monastery and worship festivals. In case of differing views on the operation of monastery, his decision is considered by the monks as binding. He is also responsible for screening, studying and selecting the candidate monk who will succeed him as the next pontiff.
Samsthana is the administrative organization that has historically managed the monastery resources, properties and endowments in accordance with historic policies and guidelines. This includes the temples, the Vedic schools, the library, the kitchen and free feeding houses for the monks and visiting pilgrims at Sringeri and other branches of the Sringeri Sharada Peetham. Prior to the 1970s change in Indian law, the Samsthana responsibilities included managing the extensive lands and its tenants.
The monastery has a number of officials with various duties. The sarvadhikari is the administrative superintendent and the parupatyagara is the manager of temples, the amildar (revenue collector from tenants on the monastery land grants), the senubova (the finance officer), the bokkasta (treasurer), achara-vichara (conduct and ethical behavior of monks), the rayasadavas (letter writers and certified messengers for pontiff's official correspondence) and others. Since the geo-political disturbances in the 18th century, the monastery added the position of subedar (legal officer who coordinated law and justice issues with the king's administration) and killedar (police officer).

The Sringeri Sharada Peetham has a network of branches in India. Some of the major branches include those in Varanasi, Haridwar, Nasik, Gaya, Mysore, Hyderabad, Madurai, Chennai, Kanchipuram, Tirupati, Coimbatore, Ramesvaram, Kalady, Ramnad and Bengaluru. The monastery also supervises a number of Vedic studies and Sanskrit schools in various parts of India. The monastery owns some agriculture land and this is farmed by the monks and monastery workers.

Modern era pontiffs
Jagadguru Vidhushekara Bharathi was appointed as Uttaradhikari of the Sringeri Sharadha Peetham by Jagadguru Bharathi Teertha Mahaswami on 23 January 2015. The last five Jagadgurus were:

Gallery

See also
 Adi Shankara
Koodli Sringeri Shankara Matam
 Shankaracharya
Kalady, Kerala - the holy birthplace of Jagadguru Adi Shankaracharya
Govardhan Peetham (East), Puri, Odisha
Dwarka Sharada Peetham (West), Dwarka, Gujarat
Jyotirmath Peetham (North), Jyotirmath, Badrikashram, Uttarakhand
Shri Kanchi Kamakoti Peetham, Kancheepuram, Tamil Nadu 
Vishaka Sri Sarada Peetham
Jagadguru of Sringeri Sharada Peetham#Guru Parampara
Shri Gaudapadacharya Math
 Ramachandrapura Math

Notes

References

Sources

External links

 Official website of Sringeri Sharada Peetha
 Tattvaloka, monthly magazine of Hinduism published by Sringeri Sharada Peetha
 Sringeri Vidya Bharati Foundation, USA
 Sringeri Vidya Bharati Foundation, Canada

 
Shankaracharya mathas in India
Religious organisations based in India
8th-century establishments in India
Adi Shankara